A cutback is a sudden change in direction by a ball carrier in American football, usually against the flow of the play. One common type of cutback would be turning an end run into a run down the middle. It is a common type of juke and the basis of the counter run.

References

American football terminology